Gabalfa is a proposed railway station on the Merthyr line in the Gabalfa district of Cardiff, Wales. The station would be on the South Wales Metro and be part of the Wales & Borders franchise. It is planned to open in 2028. It will be located on an old coal yard next to the existing railway. This followed significant local petitioning for a railway station from Gabalfa and Mynachdy.

See also 

 Proposed railway stations in Wales
 Transport in Cardiff

References 

Proposed railway stations in Wales
Railway stations scheduled to open in 2028